Sigismund's Column, originally erected in 1644, is located at Castle Square, Warsaw, Poland and is one of Warsaw's most famous landmarks as well as the first secular monument in the form of a column in modern history. The column and statue commemorate King Sigismund III Vasa, who in 1596 had moved Poland's capital from Kraków to Warsaw.

On the Corinthian column which used to be of red marble and is 8.5 m tall, a sculpture of the King, 2.75 m tall, in archaistic armour is placed. Sigismund's Column now stands at 22 m and is adorned by four eagles. The king is dressed in armour, carries a cross in one hand and wields a sword in the other.

History

17th century

Erected between 1643 and 1644, the column was constructed on the orders of Sigismund's son and successor, King Władysław IV Vasa. It was designed by the Italian-born architect Constantino Tencalla and the sculptor Clemente Molli and was cast by Daniel Tym. Sigismund's Column was modelled on the Italian column-shaped monuments in front of Basilica di Santa Maria Maggiore, erected in 1614 to designs of Carlo Maderno, and on the Column of Phocas in Rome (Władysław Vasa had seen both of them during his visit to Rome in 1625).

In 1681, the monument was surrounded with a wooden fence, which was later replaced with a permanent iron fence.

18th and 19th centuries
The marble column itself was renovated several times in the next few centuries, most notably in 1743, 1810, 1821 and 1828. In 1854, the monument was surrounded with a fountain featuring marble tritons sculpted by the German, August Kiss.

In 1863, the column was renovated somewhat again, but still needed work, and between 1885 and 1887, it was replaced with a new column of granite. Between 1927 and 1930, the monument was again renovated and was restored to its original appearance when the fountain and the fence around it were removed.

20th century
On 1 September 1944, during the Warsaw Uprising, the monument's column was demolished by the Germans, and its bronze statue was badly damaged. After the war, the statue was repaired, and in 1949, it was set up on a new column, made of granite from the Strzegom mine, a couple of metres from the original site. The original broken pieces of the column can still be seen lying next to the Royal Castle.

The inscription
On the side of the pedestal facing the Krakowskie Przedmieście is a plaque bearing these words in the finest lettering:

HONORI·ET·PIETATI
SACRAM·STATVAM·HANC·SIGISMVNDO·III·VLADISLAVS·IV
NATURA·AMORE·GENIO·FILIVS
ELECTIONE·SERIE·FELICITATE·SVCCESSOR
VOTO·ANIMO·CVLTV·GRATVS
PATRI·PATRIAE·PARENTI·OPT: MER: ANNO·DNI·MDCXLIII
PONI·IVSSIT·CVI·IAM
GLORIA·TROPHEVM·POSTERITAS·GRATITVDINEM
AETERNITAS·MONVMENTVM·POSVIT·AVT·DEBET

The inscription on the bronze plate of the column:

"King Sigismund III, by virtue of free election King of Poland, by virtue of inheritance, succession and law - King of Sweden, in love of peace and fame the first among kings, in war and victories not inferior to anyone, took prisoners of Tsar and Moscow chiefs, he conquered the capital and lands [of Moscow], defeated the Russian army, regained Smolensk, broke the power of Turkey near Khotyn, ruled for forty-four years, in the forty-fourth king"

Gallery

Original

18th century

20th century

See also 
 Warsaw Old Town
 Royal Castle, Warsaw

References

In-line:

External links

  Kolumna Zygmunta

Buildings and structures in Warsaw
Monumental columns in Poland
Buildings and structures completed in 1644
Monuments and memorials in Warsaw
1640s establishments in the Polish–Lithuanian Commonwealth
Rebuilt buildings and structures in Poland
Outdoor sculptures in Poland
Victory monuments